Mary Ann Sampson is an American artist living and working in Ragland, Alabama. Sampson is a book artist, specializing in miniatures and broadsides most of which are unique or one-of-a-kinds. She explores the book as a means of expressing visual ideas that stem from recollections of personal events and experiences that have been derived from living in her rural environment of Alabama.

Sampson received her Master in Books Arts from the University of Alabama. Sampson founded the OEOCO PRESS (One-Eye Opera Company), whose mission is to make limited edition, letterpress books, bookbinding and unique (one-of-a-kind) books.

Exhibitions
Sampson's work has been exhibited in more than 50 venues since 1983 including locations in Germany, Canada, Atlanta, Birmingham, Chicago, New York, Washington, New Mexico.
Her work has been shown extensively in galleries specializing with book arts venues including Agnes (gallery), Center For Book Arts, The Newberry Library, R. R. Donnelley Gallery, Sarah Moody Gallery, University of Alabama, University of Chicago, Birmingham Public Library, Wells Book Art Center, University of North Alabama and Syracuse University among many others.
Sampson's work was included in "UPsouth" which traveled to several venues across Birmingham, including Space One Eleven, Birmingham Civil Rights Institute, the University of Alabama at Birmingham, Visual Arts Gallery, and Agnes. It showed the work of artists Emma Amos and Willie Birch and writer bell hooks, as well as Ann Benton, Priscilla Hancock Cooper, Karen Graffeo, Janice Kluge, Lee Isaacs, J. M. Walker and Marie Weaver. The exhibition was funded through the Andy Warhol Foundation for the Arts.
She was included in "ABeCedarium: An Exhibit of Alphabet Books," juried by noteworthy peers William Drendel, book artist and Guild of Book Workers member; Paul Gehl of the Newberry Library and "ABC Books Then" curator; and Pam Spitzmueller, book artist and conservator at Harvard University. Sampson's work was exhibited alongside Emily Martin, Lucas Samaras, Claire Jeanine Satin, Christopher McAfee. This exhibition included a full catalog.
In 2010, Sampson was selected to be part of "'A Reader's Art,'" curated by Jon Coffelt for Susan Hensel Gallery in Minneapolis, MN. This was a 10-year survey of artist's books including works by Pinky Bass, Janice Kluge, Joan Lyons, Qi peng, Luce, Beatrice Coron, Buzz Spector and Sara Garden Armstrong. This exhibition included a catalog.

Works
 "Book Arts: Four Approaches" 1991 collaboration with Edith Frohock, decorative papers and binding by Paula Marie Gourley, University of Alabama, Tuscaloosa, Alabama.
 "Ragland Birds" 1994 Unique, Published by (OEOCO) Ragland, Alabama.  (Description of “Ragland Birds”)
 "Strange Birds" Unique, Published by (OEOCO) Ragland, Alabama.  (Description of “Strange Birds”)
 "Henny Penny's" Unique, Published by (OEOCO) Ragland, Alabama.  (Description of “Henny Penny”)
 "Howl at the Moon, Shoot Out the Lights" 1997 Unique, Published by (OEOCO) Ragland, Alabama.  (Interior of “Howl at the moon, Shoot Out the Lights”)
 "Fish" 1989 Unique, Published by (OEOCO) Ragland, Alabama.
 "Purple Dreams" 1989 Unique, Published by (OEOCO) Ragland, Alabama.
 "Mona Lisa in the Heart of Dixie Lounge" 1999 Unique hand-made book sculpture, Published by (OEOCO) Ragland, Alabama.  (Description of “Mona Lisa in the Heart of Dixie Lounge”)
 "A Primer of Oriental Thought" Unique, Published by (OEOCO) Ragland, Alabama.(Description of “Primer of Oriental Thought”)
 "Rejoice" 1998 Unique accordion book in cardboard box from the series "What is Hand," Published by (OEOCO) Ragland, Alabama. (Description of “Rejoice”)
 "Singing and Dancing" 1997 Unique concertina with slipcover, Published by (OEOCO) Ragland, Alabama.
 "Heart Song" 1994 Unique, Published by (OEOCO) Ragland, Alabama. (Description of “Heart Song”)
 "Do the Dog" 1991 Unique Palm book in cigar box, Published by (OEOCO) Ragland, Alabama.  (Description of “Do the Dog”)
 "Barn" 1995 Unique with pop-out, Published by (OEOCO) Ragland, Alabama.
 "Obstacles & Impediments" 2000 edition of 52, Published by (OEOCO) Ragland, Alabama.(Description of “Obstacles & Impediments”)
 "Basil Moon of Ardmore" Published by (OEOCO) Ragland, Alabama.
 "srebmun" 1990 Published by (OEOCO) Ragland, Alabama.
 "Beware of Rising Waters" Unique, Published by (OEOCO) Ragland, Alabama.
 "Landscape" 1995 Unique Unique, Published by (OEOCO) Ragland, Alabama.
 "One Moon: Two Moon; Three Moon Rising" 1991 Unique, Published by (OEOCO) Ragland, Alabama.(Description of “One Moon: Two Moon; Three Moon Rising”)
 "Aria" 1995 Unique, Published by (OEOCO) Ragland, Alabama.
 "Visual Songs and Bone Dances" 1992 Unique, Published by (OEOCO) Ragland, Alabama. (Description of “Visual Songs and Bone Dances”)
 "Pokeberry Inscription By Sue Brannan Walker" 2008 Unique, Published by (OEOCO) Ragland, Alabama. (Description of “Pokeberry Inscription”)
 "Teaching a Bird to Sing" 2004 Unique, Published by (OEOCO) Ragland, Alabama.
 "Faulkner Suite By Sue Brannan Walker" 2008 Unique, Published by (OEOCO) Ragland, Alabama. (Description of “Faulkner Suite”)
 "Prayer Book and Singer" 1994 Unique, Published by (OEOCO) Ragland, Alabama. (shown in The Anthropomorphic Book annual book exhibition) 1994, The Center for Book Arts, New York City.
 Sampson collaborated in "Macaroni and Cheese" with Terrence A. Taylor, proprietor of Duende Press in Dolomite, 1989, edition of 20 Published by Duende Press Dolomite, Alabama
 "Then From These Stones" collaboration with Dorothy Fields, 2003, edition of 50 (Hand-colored and manipulated after printing with variant bindings) Published by University of Alabama Press, Tuscaloosa, Alabama. (Description of “Then From These Stones”)
 "The Pink Riviera" for Umbrella Vol. 20 No. 2, May 1997 New York City. includes an illustrated cover by Mary Ann Sampson
 "Book Arts:  Four Approaches" collaboration with Edith Frohock, 1991, decorative papers and binding by Paula Marie Gourley, University of Alabama, Tuscaloosa, Alabama.

Audio
 Book artists and Poets 2006 Steve Miller interviews Mary Ann Sampson

References

Living people
American multimedia artists
Artists from Birmingham, Alabama
People from Ragland, Alabama
Book artists
American women artists
Year of birth missing (living people)